Craig Setari (sometimes known by the stage name Craig Ahead) is an American musician who is currently active as the bass player in Sick of It All. He has also worked with many other hardcore punk bands, including Youth of Today, Straight Ahead, Rest in Pieces, Agnostic Front and Cro-Mags. Alongside Dan Lilker, he recorded the Noise For Noise's Sake demo tape under the name Crab Society. This demo tape inspired Lilker's band S.O.D. to record their 1985 demo album titled Crab Society North.

Biography 
Setari first began listening to rock and heavy metal music at the age of twelve, through his older brother Scott and his friend Dan Lilker. One day, Lilker gifted Scott a bass, so that he could learn the instrument and join an early iteration of Anthrax. When Scott wasn't using the instrument, Craig would begin to teach himself how to play it. Within the next two years, Craig Setari would progress to listening to hardcore punk. This inspired him to join the band Straight Ahead in 1984, with Gordon Ancis and Tommy Carroll, however the band would change its name to NYC Mayhem soon after his joining. NYC Mayhem would release their debut EP We Stand in 1985 and then break up in late-1985, leading Setari to briefly join Youth of Today as their bassist. NYC Mayhem reformed in late-1986 under the name Straight Ahead, this time with Sick of It All's Armand Majidi on drums, They released their sophomore EP, Breakaway. Setari joined Sick of It All after a brief stint in Agnostic Front, in which he played bass on their 1992 album One Voice. Setari has remained with Sick of It All, helping to write tracks such as "Built to Last," which was the first New York hardcore punk track to enter the U.S. Top 100.

Discography

With Straight Ahead 
EPs
We Stand (1985)
Breakaway (1987)
Demos
Mayhemic Destruction (1985)
Violence (1985)

With Youth of Today 
Break Down the Walls (1986)

With Rest in Pieces 
Under My Skin (1990)

With Agnostic Front 
One Voice (1992)

With Sick of It All 
Scratch the Surface (1994)
Built to Last (1997)
Call to Arms (1999)
Yours Truly (2000)
Life on the Ropes (2003)
Death to Tyrants (2006)
Based on a True Story (2010)
XXV Nonstop (2011)
The Last Act of Defiance (2014)
Wake the Sleeping Dragon! (2018)

References 

Living people
American punk rock bass guitarists
American male bass guitarists
Hardcore punk musicians
Bass guitarists
20th-century American bass guitarists
Musicians from New York (state)
Musicians from Queens, New York
Boxers from New York (state)
20th-century American male musicians
Francis Lewis High School alumni
Year of birth missing (living people)
Agnostic Front members